Below is a list of characters from the R.O.D series of novels, manga and anime created by Hideyuki Kurata.

The R.O.D series of anime and manga covers the scope of the original Read or Die series of manga and light novels, the Read or Dream comics and the subsequent R.O.D the TV anime series.

Table key:
 Main: A key protagonist in the story
 Supporting: A character supporting the protagonist, or an antagonist
 Mentioned: The character is referred to in dialogue or by visual means (i.e., Nenene's signature on the post-its in the OVA)
 Cameo: The character appears briefly in a special scene, or in a flashback
 N/A: The character does not appear

R.O.D
Read or Die